Larance Norman Marable (May 21, 1929 – July 4, 2012) was a jazz drummer from Los Angeles, California.

Early life
Marable was born in Los Angeles on May 21, 1929. His family was musical, but he was largely self-taught.

Later life and career
In the 1950s, Marable played with musicians who were visiting Los Angeles; these included Dexter Gordon, Charlie Parker, and Zoot Sims. Marable recorded as a leader in 1956. He also recorded with George Shearing, Chet Baker, Milt Jackson, and other well-known musicians.

Drug problems led to Marable stopping playing in the 1960s. His career resumed in the mid-1970s, after he had ended his drug addiction. He toured with Supersax and Bobby Hutcherson in the 1970s, and was a member of Charlie Haden's Quartet West in the 1980s and 1990s.

Marable had a stroke in the 2000s and lived in a health care facility. He died in Manhattan on July 4, 2012.

Discography
With Curtis Amy
Tippin' on Through (Pacific Jazz, 1962)
With Ruth Cameron
Roadhouse (Verve, 1999)
With Chet Baker
Chet Baker Big Band (Pacific Jazz, 1956)
Playboys (Pacific Jazz, 1956)
With Conte Candoli and Lou Levy
West Coast Wailers (Atlantic, 1955)
With Kenny Drew
Kenny Drew and His Progressive Piano (Norgran, 1953–54)
Talkin' & Walkin' (Jazz:West, 1955) 
With Teddy Edwards
Back to Avalon (Contemporary, 1960 [1995])
with Victor Feldman
Stop the World I Want to Get Off (World Pacific, 1962)
With Dexter Gordon
Daddy Plays the Horn (Bethlehem, 1955)
The Resurgence of Dexter Gordon (Jazzland, 1960)
With Jimmy Giuffre
Ad Lib (Verve, 1959)
With Charlie Haden
In Angel City (Verve, 1988)
Haunted Heart (Verve, 1991)
Always Say Goodbye (Verve, 1993)
Now Is the Hour (Verve, 1995)
With Hampton Hawes
Piano East, Piano West (Prestige, 1952)
Bird Song (Contemporary, 1956 [1999])
With Richard "Groove" Holmes
After Hours (Pacific Jazz, 1962)
Tell It Like It Tis (Pacific Jazz, 1961-62 [1966])
With Milt Jackson
Ballads & Blues (Atlantic, 1956)
With Frank Morgan
Frank Morgan (Gene Norman Presents, 1955)
With Carl Perkins
Introducing Carl Perkins (Dootone, 1956)
With Robert Stewart
The Movement (Exodus, 2002)
With Sonny Stitt 
Sonny Stitt Plays Jimmy Giuffre Arrangements (Verve, 1959)

Notes

References

American jazz drummers
West Coast jazz drummers
Cool jazz drummers
Bebop drummers
Hard bop drummers
1929 births
Musicians from Los Angeles
2012 deaths
Jazz musicians from California